Dunay class is a class of Russian river passenger ships, named after Danube River. They are two-deck cargo-passenger ships built in Hungary between 1959 and 1964.

River cruise ships of the Hungarian project 305

Overview

See also
 List of river cruise ships
 Valerian Kuybyshev-class motorship
 Rossiya-class motorship (1952)
 Anton Chekhov-class motorship
 Vladimir Ilyich-class motorship
 Rodina-class motorship
 Baykal-class motorship
 Sergey Yesenin-class motorship
 Oktyabrskaya Revolyutsiya-class motorship
 Yerofey Khabarov-class motorship
 Dmitriy Furmanov-class motorship

References

River cruise ships
Ships of Russia
Ships of the Soviet Union
Hungary–Soviet Union relations